The 2021–22 season is Doncaster Rovers' 143rd year in their history and fifth consecutive season in League One. Along with the league, the club will also compete in the FA Cup, the EFL Cup and the 2021–22 EFL Trophy. The season covers the period from 1 July 2021 to 30 June 2022.

Pre-season friendlies
Rovers revealed they would have friendly matches against Rossington Main, Spennymoor Town, Bradford City, Wakefield, Newcastle United, Sheffield United and Harrogate Town as part of their pre-season preparations.

Competitions

League One

League table

Results summary

Results by matchday

Matches
Doncaster's fixtures were announced on 24 June 2021.

FA Cup

Doncaster were drawn away to Scunthorpe United in the first round and at home to Mansfield Town in the second round.

EFL Cup

Doncaster Rovers were drawn away to Walsall in the first round and Stoke City in the second round.

EFL Trophy

Rovers were drawn into Northern Group E alongside Manchester City U21s, Rotherham United and Scunthorpe United. On July 8, the dates for the group matches were confirmed.

Transfers

Transfers in

Loans in

Loans out

Transfers out

Notes

References

Doncaster Rovers
Doncaster Rovers F.C. seasons